Xenobrachyops is an extinct genus of temnospondyl amphibian from the Triassic of Australia, describing a single species, Xenobrachyops allos. It is estimated to have been around fifty centimetres long and its diet would have consisted of fish and insects.

Fossils of Xenobrachyops have been found in the Arcadia Formation at Rewan, central Queensland.

References 

Brachyopids
Induan life
Olenekian life
Triassic temnospondyls of Australia
Paleontology in Queensland
Fossil taxa described in 1972